Sarab-e Kalan (also Romanized as Sarāb-e Kalān) is a village in Zangvan Rural District, Karezan District, Sirvan County, Ilam Province, Iran. At the 2006 census, its population was 884, in 184 families. The village is populated by Kurds.

References 

Populated places in Sirvan County
Kurdish settlements in Ilam Province